The 2021–22 Coupe de France preliminary rounds, Grant Est was the qualifying competition to decide which teams from the leagues of the Grand Est region of France took part in the main competition from the seventh round.

A total of nineteen teams qualified from the Grand Est preliminary rounds. In 2020–21, CS Sedan Ardennes progressed furthest in the main competition, reaching the round of 16 before losing to Angers.

Draws and fixtures
On 30 July 2021, the league announced that a total of 943 teams had entered from the region. 820 teams enter at the first round stage, with clubs from all district level leagues and Régionale 3 included. Additionally, seven Régionale 2 teams, drawn at random, were included at this stage to take account of the late promotion of Sedan. The remaining 70 Régionale 2 teams were exempted to the second round. The second round draw was published on 31 August 2021. The third round draw was published on 14 September 2021. The fourth round draw was published on 23 September 2021. The fifth round draw was published on 6 October 2021. The sixth round draw was made on 20 October 2021.

First round
These matches were played on 28 and 29 August 2021, with one postponed to 2 September 2021.

Second round
These matches were played on 11 and 12 September 2021, with two rearranged or replayed on 19 September 2021.

Third round
These matches were played on 18 and 19 September 2021, with two postponed until 26 September 2021.

Fourth round
These matches were played on 2 and 3 October 2021.

Fifth round
These matches were played on 17 October 2021.

Sixth round
These matches were played on 30 and 31 October 2021.

References

preliminary rounds